The 2015 Colombo Sevens was the third and final leg of the Asian Sevens Series for the year.

Main draw

Pool Stage

Pool A

Pool B

Pool C

Pool D

Finals

Bottom Three playoffs

Plate

Cup

Standings

2015
2015 Asian Seven Series
2015 rugby sevens competitions
2015 in Asian rugby union
rugby sevens